Presidential elections were held in Chile in 1881,  during the War of the Pacific. Carried out through a system of electors, they resulted in the election of Domingo Santa María as President. Santa María was the sole candidate after Manuel Baquedano's resignation. However, Baquedano received 12 electoral votes in Santiago.

Results

References

Presidential elections in Chile
Chile
1881 in Chile
Election and referendum articles with incomplete results